Uwe Streb (born 17 April 1963) is a German speed skater. He competed at the 1984 Winter Olympics and the 1988 Winter Olympics.

References

External links
 

1963 births
Living people
German male speed skaters
Olympic speed skaters of West Germany
Speed skaters at the 1984 Winter Olympics
Speed skaters at the 1988 Winter Olympics
People from Pappenheim
Sportspeople from Middle Franconia
20th-century German people